NSP2 (NS35), is a rotavirus nonstructural RNA-binding protein that accumulates in cytoplasmic inclusions (viroplasms) and is required for genome replication. NSP2 is closely associated in vivo with the viral replicase. The non-structural protein NSP5 plays a role in the structure of viroplasms mediated by its interaction with NSP2.

References

Rotaviruses
Viral nonstructural proteins